Jonny Bell (born 19 June 1987) is an Irish field hockey player who plays as a defender for Lisnagarvey Hockey Club. He competed for the Ireland men's national field hockey team at the 2016 Summer Olympics.

References

1987 births
Living people
Male field hockey defenders
Olympic field hockey players of Ireland
Field hockey players at the 2016 Summer Olympics
2018 Men's Hockey World Cup players
Male field hockey players from Northern Ireland
Irish male field hockey players
British male field hockey players
Ireland international men's field hockey players
Lisnagarvey Hockey Club players
Lisburn Cricket Club players